

The Serboi was a tribe mentioned in Greco-Roman geography as living in the North Caucasus, believed by scholars to have been Sarmatian.

Etymology
Moszyński derived the name from Indo-European *ser-, *serv-, meaning "guard, protect" (cognate of Latin servus), and originally, it may have meant "guardians of animals", that is "shepherds". Similar toponyms were mentioned earlier farther away.

History
The Greco-Roman Ptolemy (100–170) mentioned in his Geography (ca. 150) the Serboi as inhabiting, along with other tribes, the land between the northeastern foothills of the Caucasus and the Volga. The tribe was included on maps of the antique Sarmatia Asiatica as Serbi, Sirbi, in the Early modern period.

The Sarmatians were eventually decisively assimilated (e.g. Slavicisation) and absorbed by the Proto-Slavic population of Eastern Europe around the Early Medieval Age. Scholars have connected the ethnonym with those of the Slavic peoples of Serbs and Croats in Europe. There is a theory that "Horoati" and their kin Serboi fled a Hunnic invasion into southern Poland and southeast Germany where they were assimilated by Slavs, and by the time of the 7th-century Slavic migration to the Balkans were completely Slavicized. Others believe that the tribe may in fact have been early Slavic, as noted by Lithuanian-American archaeologist Marija Gimbutas (1921–1994), and others. While some Serbian historians treat them as a Sarmatian tribe that was part of the Proto-Serb ethnogenesis, some more fringe theories treat them as a historical Serb tribe, pushing the Serbs' history further into antiquity. In the 10th century, the Byzantine emperor Constantine VII Porphyrogennetos mentions in his book De Ceremoniis two tribes named Krevatades (Krevatas) and Sarban (Sarbani) located in the Caucasus near Alania. There were most likely the original Sarmatian tribes, but some researchers identify them with the Croats and Serbs respectively.

See also
 Origin hypotheses of the Serbs
 Sabirs
 Sorbs (tribe)
 White Croats
 Early Slavs

Annotations

References

Sources

Tribes in Greco-Roman historiography
Sarmatian tribes
Ancient Slavs
East Slavs
Alans
History of the Serbs